The Association of Headteachers and Deputes in Scotland (AHDS) is a trade union which represents head teachers, deputy head teachers and principal teachers from nursery, primary and ASN schools in Scotland.  it has over 2,100 members.

History
It was established in 1975. In 2008 it opened membership to primary principal teachers.

AHDS has no political affiliation and is not a member of the Scottish Trades Union Congress.

Sources
 www.ahds.org.uk

References

External links
 

1975 establishments in Scotland
Educational organisations based in Scotland
Education International
Education trade unions
Trade unions in Scotland
Trade unions established in 1975
Teacher associations based in the United Kingdom
Secondary education in Scotland